Los Angeles City Council District 2 is one of the 15 districts of the Los Angeles City Council.  The 2nd District began its existence in the Hollywood area but now covers much of the far eastern and southeastern portions of the San Fernando Valley and parts of the Crescenta Valley.  The current representative is Paul Krekorian.

Demographics

Council District 2 had a population of 260,065 people in 2012. There were 96,059 households, with an average size of 2.69 persons per household, according to a 2012 City of Los Angeles report on economic policy.

The median household income in 2012 was $45,043.  Per capita income for the district was 24,622. 14.3% of households earned an income below the poverty level.

45.7% of the population were Latino.  The racial makeup of the district was 61.4% white, 21.7% other race, 6.9% Asian, 4.8% two or more races, 4.4% black.

Geography

Modern

The Second District stretches from the hills of Studio City to the edge of Verdugo Mountains Park in Sun Valley. It includes North Hollywood, Studio City, Sun Valley, Valley Village, Van Nuys and Valley Glen.

Official city map of the district.

Historic

A new city charter effective in 1925 replaced the former "at large" voting system for a nine-member council with a district system with a 15-member council. Each district was to be approximately equal in population, based upon the voting in the previous gubernatorial election; thus redistricting was done every four years. (At present, redistricting is done every ten years, based upon the preceding U.S. census results.) The numbering system established in 1925 for City Council districts began with No. 1 in the north of the city, the San Fernando Valley, and ended with No. 15 in the south, the Harbor area.

Rough boundaries or descriptions of the 2nd District have been as follows:

20th Century

1925. Hollywood south of Franklin Avenue or Hollywood Boulevard and north of Santa Monica Boulevard, and the Los Feliz district. It was described later the same year as simply "Hollywood."

1926. Hollywood,  with district headquarters at 2495 Glendower Avenue.

1928. East boundary: Vermont Avenue. South boundary: Melrose Avenue to Seward Street, Fountain Avenue, north of Beverly Hills. West boundary: Beverly Glen

1932–33. Hollywood west of Vermont, north of Melrose and west to Beverly Hills.

1935. Same as in 1932.

1937. "Bounded on the north by the Hollywood Hills, south by Melrose Avenue, east by the 1st Councilmanic District and west by Beverly Glen Boulevard."

1940. "The general trend is westward and northeastward, due to heavy construction in the San Fernando Valley and the beach areas." Essentially the same as before, but with the district extended northeast to include Griffith Park.

1944. Enlarged to include Riverside Drive and Studio City.

1955. Hollywood and a "sizable portion" of the San Fernando Valley, generally west of Ventura Boulevard and extending north to Encino.

1960.The 2nd District was divested of its Hollywood area, which was instead attached to the 13th District. Its boundaries moved north and west, taking over Encino and parts of Van Nuys and North Hollywood.

1975. No longer representing Hollywood, the district now takes in Sherman Oaks, Studio City, the Los Feliz district and Atwater.

1979. "A mixture of wealth and earthier life-styles that reaches from the San Diego Freeway through the Santa Monica Mountains to Griffith Park and beyond. Communities as scattered as Atwater, North Hollywood and Los Feliz are included in it, as well as the more affluent part of Studio City and the Hollywood Hills."

1982. "The district straddles the Santa Monica Mountains east of the San Diego Freeway, taking in Sherman Oaks, Studio City, North Hollywood and the canyons north of Beverly Hills between Beverly Drive and Laurel Canyon Boulevard. New to the district are Atwater, Glassell Park, Highland Park and Mount Washington. Removed from the district were Benedict Canyon, Los Feliz and Hollywood."

1986. After the death of Councilman Howard Finn in 1986, his 1st District was moved to near Downtown to provide for election of a Hispanic, and Districts 2 and 7 took over his old area. The 2nd was thereafter a totally San Fernando Valley district, extending from Studio City on the south, through Van Nuys to Sunland-Tujunga.<ref>[https://search.proquest.com/docview/154826193 "Los Angeles' Realigned Council Districts," Los Angeles Times," September 21, 1986, page B-3]</ref>

21st Century

2001. Sunland, Tujunga, Shadow Hills and La Tuna Canyon, and parts of Sun Valley, North Hollywood, Arleta, Lake View Terrace, Panorama City, Mission Hills, North Hills, Valley Village, Studio City and Van Nuys.

2003. Parts of Sherman Oaks, Valley Glen, Studio City, North Hollywood, Sunland-Tujunga, Lake View Terrace, Shadow Hills, La Tuna Canyon, and Van Nuys.

2012. As a result of redistricting, the district boundaries shifted south. Effective July 1, 2012, it no longer included Sunland-Tujunga, La Tuna Canyon, Lakeview Terrace, Shadow Hills and Sherman Oaks. It picked up nearly all of North Hollywood, Studio City and Valley Village, in addition to the NoHo Arts District, and portions of Campo de Cahuenga and the Universal City Metro station.

Officeholders

The district has been represented by eleven men and one woman.

See also

 List of Los Angeles municipal election returns
 Sunland-Tujunga, Los Angeles#City Council redistricting: 1986–2002, for how the 2nd District was extended to the Northeast Valley

References

Access to the Los Angeles Times'' links requires the use of a library card.

External links
 Official Los Angeles City Council District 2 website

LACD02
San Fernando Valley
North Hollywood, Los Angeles
Studio City, Los Angeles
Sun Valley, Los Angeles
Sunland-Tujunga, Los Angeles
Van Nuys, Los Angeles